The Ministry of Industry (Abrv: M-Industry;) is a cabinet ministry in the Government of Thailand. The ministry is responsible for the promotion and regulation of industries.

History
The Ministry of Industry (MOI) began in 1933 as a division of the Thai government, the Industrial Division, in the Department of Commerce (( now the Ministry of Commerce), which was part of the defunct Ministry of Economics (. In 1941, the division was upgraded to the Department of Industry (still in the Economic Ministry). On 5 May 1942, the Ministry of Industry was created in its own right.

Budget
The ministry's fiscal year 2019 (FY2019) budget is 5,231.2 million baht, down from 5,653.7 million baht in FY2018.

Ministry of Industry Network 

On 1 March 2019, the driving committee of the institutions under the Ministry of Industry aimed to create public awareness of its network of institutions. An Industry Network logo was created to be used in publicizing the mission of the institution networks as a symbol of their cooperation in driving Thailand’s mission in the digital age.

Departments
Organization of the MOI is based on information from the following sources:
 Ministry of Industry - Organization Chart

Administration
Office of the Minister
Office of the Permanent Secretary

Dependent departments
Industrial Economic Cluster
The Office of Industrial Economics (OIE)
Office of Cane and Sugar Board (OCSB)
Production Process Supervision Cluster
Department of Industrial Works (DIW)
Department of Primary Industries and Mines (DPIM)
Industrial and Entrepreneurial Promotion CLuster
Department of Industrial Promotion (DIP)
Thai Industrial Standards Institute (TISI)

State enterprises
Industrial Estate Authority of Thailand

Independent and autonomous organizations
The first institutes under the MOI were established in the 1970s under the Department of Industrial Promotion (DIP) and covered a few areas like textiles and metalworking. In the second half of the 1990s, these initial institutes were revamped with several of its divisions and centers being made autonomous, including the National Food Institute, the Thailand Textile Institute, the Electrical and Electronics Institute, and the Thai Productivity Institute, primarily through relocating some research and laboratory testing functions. These were established outside the bureaucratic structure to provide better support services that included training, consultancy, testing and laboratory services, and provision of market information. As autonomous institutes, they were able to provide better compensation to attract private sector managers and professionals and were also able to have more flexible budgetary arrangements. These autonomous institutes were given five years in which to become financially self-supporting.
Foundation for Industrial Development (FID)
 Thai-German Institute (TGI)
 Thailand Textile Institute (THTI)
 National Food Institute (NFI)
Management System Certification Institute (MASCI)
 Electrical and Electronics Institute (EEI)
 Thailand Automotive Institute (TAI)
 Iron and Steel Institute of Thailand (ISIT)
 Plastics Institute of Thailand (PITH)
 National Hazardous Substances Committee (NHSC)
Thailand Productivity Institute
The Institute for Small and Medium Enterprise Development (ISMED)
 (moved from under the MOI in 2014)

Others
 General Environmental Conservation Public Company Limited
Narai Phand Company Limited

See also
Cabinet of Thailand
Economy of Thailand
Federation of Thai Industries
Government of Thailand
List of Government Ministers of Thailand

References

External links
 Official Ministry of Industry (Thailand) Webpage

 
Industry
Economy of Thailand
Thailand, Industry
1942 establishments in Thailand